Widmore can refer to:

 Widmore, London, a neighborhood in Bromley
 Widmore family from Lost (TV series):
 Charles Widmore, industrialist and father of Penny Widmore
 Penny Widmore, love interest of Desmond Hume and daughter of Charles Widmore